Jarinter Mwasya (born 30 December 1996) is a Kenyan track and field athlete. She was the 2022 African champion over 800 metres.

Early life
Mwaysa is from Iuani a mountainous region in Makueni County. She started running at Nthukula Secondary School in Wote. In 2013 she achieved her first medal over 800m whilst competing at the East Africa School Games in Lira, Uganda. Mwaysa joined the Kenya Defence Force in 2015.

Career
In May 2022 she achieved a new personal best time of 1:59.84 at the Meeting international du SATUC in Toulouse. Mwaysa then won the 800m African Championship race in 2022 held at Saint Pierre, Mauritius. Competing at the World Athletics Championships in Eugene, Oregon in July, 2022 Mwaysa finished fifth in her heat won by Diribe Welteji and therefore did not progress to the semi-finals. Mwaysa was sprinted out of the qualifying positions as she finished fourth in her heat racing at the 2022 Commonwealth Games 800m by Keely Hodgkinson, Catriona Bisset
and Jemma Reekie with all four athletes finishing under a second apart in Birmingham, England.

References

External links
 

1996 births
Living people
Kenyan female middle-distance runners
Commonwealth Games competitors for Kenya
World Athletics Championships athletes for Kenya
People from Makueni County